Part of the human brain, the basal forebrain structures are located in the forebrain to the front of and below the striatum. They include the ventral basal ganglia (including nucleus accumbens and ventral pallidum), nucleus basalis, diagonal band of Broca, substantia innominata, and the medial septal nucleus. These structures are important in the production of acetylcholine, which is then distributed widely throughout the brain. The basal forebrain is considered to be the major cholinergic output of the central nervous system (CNS) centred on the output of the nucleus basalis. The presence of non-cholinergic neurons projecting to the cortex have been found to act with the cholinergic neurons to dynamically modulate activity in the cortex.

Function
Acetylcholine is known to promote wakefulness in the basal forebrain. Stimulating the basal forebrain gives rise to acetylcholine release, which induces wakefulness and REM sleep, whereas inhibition of acetylcholine release in the basal forebrain by adenosine causes slow wave sleep. The nucleus basalis is the main neuromodulator of the basal forebrain and gives widespread cholinergic projections to the neocortex. The nucleus basalis is an essential part of the neuromodulatory system that controls behaviour by regulating arousal and attention. The nucleus basalis is also seen to be a critical node in the memory circuit.

The importance of non-cholinergic neurons in the basal forebrain structures has been shown in working together with the cholinergic neurons in a dynamically modulatory way. This is seen to play a significant role in cognitive functions.

Adenosine acts on A1 receptors of cholinergic neurons in the basal forebrain. This results in hyperpolarization of cholinergic neurons, which inhibits the release of acetylcholine.

Nitric oxide production in the basal forebrain is both necessary and sufficient to produce sleep.

Clinical significance
Acetylcholine affects the ability of brain cells to transmit information to one another, and also encourages neuronal plasticity, or learning. Thus, damage to the basal forebrain can reduce the amount of acetylcholine in the brain and impair learning. This may be one reason why basal forebrain damage can result in memory impairments such as amnesia and confabulation. One common cause of basal forebrain damage is an aneurysm of the anterior communicating artery.

It is thought that damage to the nucleus basalis and its cortical projections are implicated in forms of dementia, notably Alzheimer's dementia and Parkinson's disease dementia. There have been studies on the use of deep brain stimulation to the nucleus basalis, in the treatment of dementia, and while giving some positive results trials are still being undertaken.

References

Rostral basal ganglia and associated structures